Liparomyia is a genus of fly in the family Dolichopodidae, known from Tasmania and the Australian Capital Territory.

Species
 Liparomyia sedata White, 1916
 Liparomyia separata (Parent, 1932)

References

Dolichopodidae genera
Sympycninae
Diptera of Australasia
Arthropods of Tasmania
Fauna of the Australian Capital Territory